Eric Gordon (born 1988) is an American basketball player.

Eric Gordon may also refer to:

Eric Gordon (American football) (born 1987), American football player in the Canadian Football League
Eric Gordon (bishop) (1905–1992), Anglican bishop in England
Eric Gordon (footballer) (1898–1981), Australian rules footballer
Eric Gordon (racing driver) (born 1967), American racing driver
E. V. Gordon (1896–1938), Canadian philologist
Eric Gordon, founder of the British newspaper Camden New Journal
Eric Gordon, a fictional character in the 1995 comedy film Billy Madison

See also
Erick Gordon, educator